Aju Business Daily (also known as Ajunews) is a economic newspaper launched in October 2007 by former Korea Economic Daily and  reporter Kwak Young-gil, and published in South Korea. Based in Seoul, it is a major newspaper in South Korea.

History
Aju Business Daily was founded in October 2007. In October 2010, it began to cooperate with Hong Kong-based Wen Wei Po to provide news about the Chinese economy.

References

Mass media in Seoul
Publications established in 2007
Daily newspapers published in South Korea